David Lee Oliver (born April 17, 1971) is a Canadian assistant coach for the New York Rangers of the National Hockey League (NHL) and a former professional ice hockey player who played several seasons in the NHL.

Career
A graduate of the University of Michigan, Oliver began his NHL career with the Edmonton Oilers in 1994. He would also play with the New York Rangers, Ottawa Senators, Phoenix Coyotes and Dallas Stars.

Oliver has also played in the American Hockey League, International Hockey League, Germany's Deutsche Eishockey Liga, and the United Kingdom's British National League.

In 2007, Oliver joined the Colorado Avalanche where he worked for 11 seasons, serving as Director of Hockey Operations of the Lake Erie Monsters, Colorado's American Hockey League affiliate, an Assistant Coach with Lake Erie for two seasons and General Manager for three seasons. He also served as Colorado's Director of Player Development, a role which he held for six seasons. On July 17, 2018, the New York Rangers announced that Oliver would be joining David Quinn as an assistant coach for the team, along with Greg Brown.

Career statistics

Regular season and playoffs

Awards and honours

References

External links

1971 births
Living people
Canadian ice hockey forwards
Cape Breton Oilers players
Colorado Avalanche executives
Dallas Stars players
Edmonton Oilers draft picks
Edmonton Oilers players
Grand Rapids Griffins players
Guildford Flames players
Houston Aeros (1994–2013) players
Ice hockey people from British Columbia
Iowa Stars players
Michigan Wolverines men's ice hockey players
München Barons players
New York Rangers players
Ottawa Senators players
People from the Sunshine Coast Regional District
Phoenix Coyotes players
Utah Grizzlies (AHL) players
Vernon Lakers players
Canadian expatriate ice hockey players in England
Canadian expatriate ice hockey players in Germany
AHCA Division I men's ice hockey All-Americans